The Clarice Bean series is a series of children's books written and illustrated by English author Lauren Child from 1999. The stories follow middle schooler Clarice Bean and her challenges navigating the complex ethical, social and philosophical questions children deal with at school and at home. 
A spin-off series titled Ruby Redfort, which the US publisher called a "six-book middlegrade fiction series" in advance, was inaugurated in 2011.

Books 

 Clarice Bean, That's Me (Orchard Books, 1999) 
 My Uncle Is a Hunkle, Says Clarice Bean (Orchard Books, September 2001)
 Clarice Bean, Guess Who's Babysitting? (Candlewick Press, March 2001) —an adaptation of My Uncle Is a Hunkle for the U.S. market
 What Planet Are You From, Clarice Bean? (Orchard Books, 2001)
 Utterly me, Clarice Bean (Orchard Books, 2002)
 Clarice Bean Spells Trouble (Orchard Books, 2004)
 Clarice Bean, Don't Look Now (Orchard Books, 2006)
 Clarice Bean: Think Like an Elf (Orchard Books, 2021)
 Clarice Bean: Scram! (Orchard Books, 2022)

Awards and nominations

Both "Clarice Bean,That's Me" and "What Planet Are You From, Clarice Bean?" were bronze medal winners of the Smarties Prize, in the 6–8 years category, in 1999, and in 2001, respectively. The latter won the Kids Club category.
"Clarice Bean,That's Me" was also a highly commended runner-up for the Kate Greenaway Medal, the annual British Library Association award for children's book illustration.
"Clarice Bean Spells Trouble" made the shortlists for both the British Children's Book of the Year and the Red House Children's Book Award.

Characters

The Tuesday Family 
Clarice Bean's family consists of:
Clarice Bean Tuesday (age 12), Minal Cricket Tuesday (her younger brother, age 5, who is a "maggot", Marcie Tuesday (her older sister, age 14), Kurt Tuesday (her older brother, age 16), her father, her mother, her grandfather, and her grandmother.

Betty P. Moody 

Betty Moody is Clarice Bean's best friend, and they do most things together. Clarice and Betty both love the Ruby Redfort series. Betty also loves dogs, and in the first book she received a dog from Clarice's grandad's best friend. She appears in the series wearing glasses. She and her parents traveled a lot, along with call-me-Mol and call-me-Cecil. In the last book, she moves to San Francisco because call-me-Mol goes to California for a vacation, but finds a job and decides to stay there.

Karl Wrenbury 

Karl is the son of a single mother. His dad ran away when he was younger. He is featured at first as an enemy and later as a friend. He is very good with dogs, and helps train Grandad and their dog, Cement, manners. He is a trouble maker and always gets into trouble with Mrs. Wilberton their class schoolteacher. He is often sent to Mr. Pickering's office for his bad behavior. In one of the books, he throws his chair across the room.

Grace Grapello

Grace is Clarice Bean's worst enemy. She is often very mean to Clarice for no particular reason, especially about her spelling. She is good at just about everything and people say she is the teacher's pet. Mrs. Wilberton never believes Clarice Bean and always believes Grace.

Mrs. Wilberton

Mrs. Wilberton is Clarice Bean's Teacher. She does not seem to be particularly nice and is always telling Clarice off about her spelling. Clarice Bean describes Mrs. Wilberton as having a "honking goose voice" and "a big derriere". She also possesses a gait which Clarice Bean and Karl describe as "walking on trotters", and which Karl often impersonates.

Clem Hansson 

Clem is a new girl at Clarice Bean's school. She is from Sweden and has a pet rabbit called Kahneen, which is Swedish for rabbit. Clarice describes Clem as Sadie Blanch, a fictional character from the Ruby Redfort series.

Czarina

Czarina is Clarice Bean's drama teacher who is going to have a baby.

Book within the book
An important plot device is the Ruby Redfort collection, a series of fictional books in which Clarice Bean and Betty Moody frequently find inspiration. They are about a young, American girl, who is an undercover secret agent. In Clarice Bean Spells Trouble, Clarice and Betty also watch the Ruby Redfort television series, which was adapted from the books. In Utterly Me, Clarice Bean, it is revealed that Hollywood are adapting it into a film. There are nine books in the Ruby Redfort series:
 There Was a Girl Called Ruby
 Run For It, Ruby
 Where in the World Are You, Ruby Redfort?
 R U 4 Real, Ruby Redfort?
 Run Ruby Run
 Who Will Rescue Ruby Redfort?
 Ruby Redfort Saves the Day
 Ruby Redfort Rules
 Rush to Russia Ruby

The fictional author is Patricia F Maplin Stacey, whom Betty actually meets in Russia, where she gets a Ruby Redfort book signed. In another book, Clarice gets to be in a movie starring "Skyler Summer" as Ruby Redfort.

Hitch is a character in the Ruby Redfort series. He is the Redfort family butler. He is the only one in the Redfort household that is aware that Ruby is a secret agent. Hitch often helps Ruby escape from tricky situations.

Lauren Child contracted to begin a real Ruby Redfort series in autumn 2011.
As of 2022, the Ruby Redfort series has concluded with 6 instalments.

Ruby Redfort Books 
The Ruby Redfort books are now actual books and there are six in the series so far. These include:
1 Ruby Redfort: Look Into My Eyes
2 Ruby Redfort: Take Your Last Breath
3 Ruby Redfort: Catch Your Death
4 Ruby Redfort: Feel the Fear
5 Ruby Redfort: Pick your Poison
6 Ruby Redfort: Blink and You Die

See also

Notes

References

External links

 

British children's novels
Series of children's books